Martin P. Robinson (born March 9, 1954) is an American puppeteer who works for the Jim Henson Company. He is best known for his work on Sesame Street, having performed the characters of Telly Monster, Mr. Snuffleupagus, Oscar the Grouch's pet worm Slimey, Oscar's niece Irvine, Buster the Horse, and Shelley the Turtle for 40 years. He also designed, built and performed the Audrey II puppets for Little Shop of Horrors. Robinson performed the characters Riff the Cat and Clef the dad on Allegra's Window, and was an animatronic puppeteer for Leonardo in Teenage Mutant Ninja Turtles. He was responsible for training the puppeteers on Sesame Tree, and performed the Cat in the Hat in the second season of The Wubbulous World of Dr. Seuss.

Early life
Robinson was born on March 9, 1954, in Dearborn, Michigan, and graduated from Brookfield East High School in Brookfield, Wisconsin, a suburb of Milwaukee.

Personal life
Robinson married Sesame Street writer Annie Evans on August 9, 2008, on the set of Sesame Street in the Kaufman Astoria Studios in Queens, New York. Annie gave birth to twin daughters, Lyra and Ripley, on February 12, 2009. Robinson also has three stepchildren from a previous marriage.

Filmography
 Muppet Meeting Films – Papa Luigi ("Computer!")
 The Muppets Take Manhattan – The Swedish Chef (hands), Buster the Horse, Additional Muppets
 Sesame Street Presents: Follow That Bird – Telly, Mr. Snuffleupagus, Board of Birds Member, Grouch Diner Patron, Additional Muppets
 Sesame Street – Telly, Snuffy, Slimey, Monty, Buster the Horse, Dicky Tick, Vincent Twice, Old MacDonald, Additional Muppets
 Allegra's Window – Clef, Riff
 Little Shop of Horrors – Audrey II (puppeteer in the original 1982 off-Broadway and 2003 Broadway productions)
 Elmo's World – Telly Monster, Mr. Snuffleupagus, Slimey, Old MacDonald
 Little Muppet Monsters – Rat, Cow, Walrus, Additional Muppets
 The Tale of the Bunny Picnic – Farmer, Additional Muppets
 A Muppet Family Christmas – Additional Muppets
 Jim Henson's Play-Along Video – Crocodile, Raccoon, Additional Muppets
 The Transformers – Powermaster Optimus Prime (puppeteer in the live-action segments of season 5)
 Teenage Mutant Ninja Turtles – Leonardo (face)
 The Muppets Celebrate Jim Henson – Telly, Additional Muppets
 Muppet Sing-Alongs – Big Snort, Shark, Additional Muppets
 Elmo Saves Christmas – Telly, Snuffy, Santa's Elf, Additional Muppets
 The Adventures of Elmo in Grouchland – Telly, Laundromat Manager, Little Ricky
 The Wubbulous World of Dr. Seuss – The Cat in the Hat (Season 2)
 Roary the Racing Car - Mr. Carburettor (US)

See also
List of Sesame Street puppeteers

References

External links

American puppeteers
Muppet performers
Sesame Street Muppeteers
Living people
People from Brookfield, Wisconsin
1954 births
Animatronic engineers